Oru Ponnu Oru Paiyan (lit. A boy and a girl) is a 2007 Tamil romance film directed by Naren Deivanayagam. It dwells on the untold love of a pair due to family circumstances. The film stars Sandeep, Roopasree, Shubha Poonja and Madhu. The film was dubbed in Telugu as Mamatha - 100% Prema.

Plot
Sakthi (Sandeep) is the only son of Sharath Babu and Bhanupriya. Having tired of urban living, the elderly couple takes up residence in a village along with their son. Viswanathan (Madhu) is the head of the village. He is highly respected for his fairness and for his love and compassion for the poor. His granddaughter (played by Roopa) is a village belle. She catches Sakthi's attention as she flits around the village like a butterfly. The two are drawn towards each other and eventually fall in love. Their affair has the tacit blessings of Viswanathan. But it is not going to be a bed of roses for the two as trouble brews up in the person of Sakthi's ex-flame, city-bred glamour girl played by Shubha Punja.

Cast
 Sandeep as Sakthi
 Roopasree
 Shubha Poonja
 Sarath Babu
 Bhanupriya
 Sadhana
 Charle
 Charan Raj
 Subbalakshmi
  Rajesh Hebbar
 Shanti Williams
 Aarthi
 Crane Manohar
 Suruli Manohar
 Madhu as Viswanathan

Production
K. Vishwanath was initially cast as the village head.

Soundtrack
Soundtrack was composed by Karthik Raja.

References

2007 films
2000s Tamil-language films
Indian romance films
2000s romance films

Films scored by Karthik Raja